The 1945 Auburn Tigers football team represented Auburn University in the 1945 college football season. It was the Tigers' 54th overall and 13th season as a member of the Southeastern Conference (SEC). The team was led by head coach Carl M. Voyles, in his second year, and played their home games at Auburn Stadium in Auburn, the Cramton Bowl in Montgomery and Legion Field in Birmingham, Alabama. They finished the season with a record of five wins and five losses (5–5 overall, 2–3 in the SEC).

Schedule

Source: 1945 Auburn football schedule

References

Auburn
Auburn Tigers football seasons
Auburn Tigers football